The BCL Molecular 18 was a range of 18-bit computers designed and manufactured in the UK from 1970 until the late 1980s.The machines were originally manufactured by Systemation Limited and sold by Business Mechanisation Limited.  The two companies merged in 1968 to form Business Computers Limited - later a public limited company.  Business Computers Ltd subsequently went into receivership in 1974.  It was purchased from the receiver by Computer World Trade, maintenance of existing machines was by a subsidiary of CWT called CFM, manufacturing was passed to ABS Computer in the old BCL building in Portslade and sales rights were sold to a team from the old Singer Computers by 1976 trading as Business Computers (Systems) Ltd selling the Molecular.  BC(S) Ltd subsequently went public in 1981 to form Business Computers (Systems) Plc.  Servicing and manufacturing was gradually taken over by Systemation Services/ Systemation Developments Ltd.  BC(S)Plc was eventually taken over by Electronic Data Processing (EDP). Amongst its users and service engineers it was affectionately known as the Molly.

Note that neither SADIE nor SUSIE shared any technology with the Molecular series.

External links
BCL Molecular 18 Minicomputer
BCL Susie Computer @ The Centre for Computing History

Minicomputers
18-bit computers